Tonstad is a former municipality that was located in the old Vest-Agder county in Norway.  The  municipality existed from 1905 until 1960. It encompassed the southern part of the present-day municipality of Sirdal.  The administrative center of the municipality was the village of Tonstad where Tonstad Church is located.

History
The municipality of Tonstad was established on 1 January 1905 when the old municipality of Sirdal was divided into two municipalities: Tonstad (population: 828) and Øvre Sirdal (population: 753). During the 1960s, there were many municipal mergers across Norway due to the work of the Schei Committee. On 1 January 1960, Tonstad (population: 651) was merged with Øvre Sirdal and the Øksendal area of Bakke to form a new municipality of Sirdal.

Name
The municipality of Tonstad was named after the old Tonstad farm, since the church is located there.

Government
All municipalities in Norway, including Tonstad, are responsible for primary education (through 10th grade), outpatient health services, senior citizen services, unemployment and other social services, zoning, economic development, and municipal roads.  The municipality was governed by a municipal council of elected representatives, which in turn elected a mayor.

Municipal council
The municipal council  of Tonstad was made up of representatives that were elected to four year terms.  The party breakdown of the final municipal council was as follows:

See also
List of former municipalities of Norway

References

Sirdal
Former municipalities of Norway
1905 establishments in Norway
1960 disestablishments in Norway